Leopold Neubauer (born 15 October 1889 in Vienna, date of death unknown) was an Austrian international footballer who played as a striker.

International career
Neubauer played for Austria's senior football team back when Austria was still part of Austria-Hungary. He represented Austria at the Olympic Games in 1912, where he scored once in a regular Olympic match and once in the consolation tournament.

Honours

Individual
Austrian Bundesliga top scorer (1): 1916–1917

References

External links
 

1889 births
Year of death unknown
Austrian footballers
Austria international footballers
Olympic footballers of Austria
Footballers at the 1912 Summer Olympics
Association football forwards
Wiener Sport-Club players
Austrian football managers